Neomallocera opulenta is a species of beetle in the family Cerambycidae, the only species in the genus Neomallocera.

References

Elaphidiini